Ferdinando Scianna (4 July 1943) is an Italian photographer. Scianna won the Prix Nadar in 1966 and became a full member of Magnum Photos in 1989. He has produced numerous books.

Career
Scianna took up photography while studying literature, philosophy and art history at the University of Palermo in the 1960s. He moved to Milan in 1966 and started working as a photographer for L'Europeo in 1967, becoming a journalist there in 1973. Scianna wrote on politics for Le Monde diplomatique and on literature and photography for La Quinzaine Littéraire. He first joined Magnum Photos in 1982, becoming a full member in 1989.

He took up fashion photography in the late 1980s. His first work, in 1987, was to photograph Marpessa Hennink for Dolce & Gabbana's advertising campaign for their Fall/Winter collection, clothing which was inspired by Sicily.
345tr

Publications

Publications by Scianna
Feste Religiose in Sicilia. Italy: Leonardo da Vinci Arte, 1965. With an essay by Leonardo Sciascia.
Palermo, Italy: L'Immagine Editrice, 1987.
La villa dei mostri. Einaudi letteratura 55. Torino: G. Einaudi, 1977. .
I Siciliani. Italy: Einaudi, 1977.
Les Siciliens.France: Editions Denoël, 1977.
I Grandi Fotografi: Ferdinando Scianno. Milan: Gruppo Editoriale Fabbri, 1983.
Il Grande Libro della Sicilia. Italy: Mandadori, 1984.
Ferdinando Scianna: l'Istante e la Forma. Siracusa: Ediprint, 1987. .
Città del Mondo. Italy: Bompiani, 1988.
Kami. Italy: L’Immagine, 1988.
Ore di Spagna. Spain: Pungitopo, 1988. With a text by Leonardo Sciascia.
Rome: Contrasto, 2016. . 
Le Forme del Caos. Italy: Art & SRL, 1989. A retrospective.
Leonardo Sciascia. Italy: Franco Sciardelli, 1989.
Men and Trucks. Italy: Iveco, 1990.
Marpessa. Italy: Leonardo Arte, 1993. Photographs of Marpessa Hennink.
French-language edition. Contrejour, 1993. .
Altrove: Reportage Di Moda. Italy: Federico Motta, 1995.
Viaggio a Lourdes. Italy: Mondadori, 1996. About religious rituals.
Dormire Forse Sognare. Tavagnacco, Italy: Artes Gráficas Friulane, 1997.
 To Sleep, Perchance to Dream. London, New York City: Phaidon, 1997. .
Jorge Luis Borges. Italy: Franco Sciardelli, 1999. Portraits of Jorge Luis Borges.
Niños del Mundo. Ayuntamiento De La Coruña, Spain, 1999
Obiettivo Ambiguo. Italy: Rizzoli, 2001.
Mondo Bambino. Italy: L'arte a stampa, 2002.
Quelli di Bagheria. Lugano: Fondazione Galleria Gottardo, 2002. . Text in English, Italian and Spanish. Photographs and writing on his home town of Bagheria in Sicily.
Italy: Peliti Associati, 2003
Antonino Bencivinni, I Miei Volti Della Sicilia. Armando, 2006. .
Ferdinando Scianna. Actes Sud, 2008. . Contrasto. .
Autoritratto di un Fotografo. Testi E Pretesti, 2011. . Edited by Bruno Mondadori.
Obiettivo Ambiguo. Rome: Contrasto, 2015. .

Publications with contributions by Scianna
Henri Cartier-Bresson: Ritratti. 1983. Milan: Gruppo Editoriale Fabbri. Photographs by Henri Cartier-Bresson. With a text by Scianna, "I Grandi Fotografi," and by André Pieyre de Mandiargues . Italian-language edition.
Henri Cartier-Bresson: Portraits. UK: Collins, 1984. English-language edition.
Spanish-language edition.

Award
1966: Prix Nadar

References

External links
Ferdinando Scianna's Cats
Profile at Magnum Photos

Scianna's photographs of Marpessa Hennink in Sicily for Dolce & Gabbana

1943 births
Living people
People from Bagheria
Photographers from Sicily
Magnum photographers
Fashion photographers